Ian Bakala (born 1 November 1980) is a Zambian former footballer.

International career
The midfielder was part of the Zambian 2006 African Nations Cup team, who finished third in group C in the first round of competition, thus failing to secure qualification for the quarter-finals. He also took part at the 1999 FIFA World Youth Championship.

Clubs
2001–2003:  Kabwe Warriors
2003–2004:  K.F.C. Germinal Beerschot
2004–2005:  CAPS United FC
2006–2008:  Primeiro de Agosto
2009:  Kabuscorp Sport Clube do Palanca
2010–2012  Progresso Sambizanga
 2014:  - União Sport Clube do Uíge

Notes

1980 births
Living people
Zambian footballers
Beerschot A.C. players
C.D. Primeiro de Agosto players
CAPS United players
Kabuscorp S.C.P. players
Progresso Associação do Sambizanga players
Zambian expatriate footballers
Expatriate footballers in Belgium
Expatriate footballers in Zimbabwe
Expatriate footballers in Angola
Zambia international footballers
Zambian expatriate sportspeople in Angola
Zambian expatriate sportspeople in Belgium
Zambian expatriate sportspeople in Zimbabwe
Kabwe Warriors F.C. players
2002 African Cup of Nations players
2006 Africa Cup of Nations players
2008 Africa Cup of Nations players
Association football wingers